Lillian D. Rock (1896-1974) was an American lawyer and political activist. Rock is best remembered as the founder in 1935 of the League for a Woman President and Vice President.

Biography

Early years

Lillian D. Rock was born August 6, 1896 in New York City to Joel Rock and the former Ida Libby Gross.

Following high school she obtained an undergraduate degree before enrolling in Brooklyn Law School, from which she graduated in 1923. She passed the New York state bar exam in 1925 and entered practice with her brother Nathaniel as part of the New York City law firm Rock and Rock. The pair remained in practice for over a decade, handling more than 5,000 cases by their own count.

Political activism

Rock was active in the National Association of Women Lawyers.

In 1935 Rock founded a political organization called League for a Woman President and Vice President, with its mission the persuasion of one of the major American political parties to nominate a woman for one or both of these top executive governmental positions by 1940.

Footnotes

Works

 "The Need for and the Purpose of the National Association of Women Lawyers," Women Lawyers' Journal, vol. 18 (1930), pp. 15–17.

Further reading

 Obituary, New York Times, May 15, 1974, pg. 48.

1896 births
1974 deaths
Lawyers from New York City
Jewish American attorneys
Brooklyn Law School alumni
New York (state) lawyers
20th-century American lawyers
20th-century American Jews